Be Kind Rewind is a 2008 buddy comedy-drama film written and directed by Michel Gondry, and starring Jack Black, Mos Def, Melonie Diaz, Danny Glover, Mia Farrow and Sigourney Weaver. The film first appeared on January 20, 2008 at the 2008 Sundance Film Festival. It was later shown at the Berlin International Film Festival. The film opened on February 22, 2008 in the United Kingdom and in North America.

The title is inspired by a phrase that was commonly displayed on video rental cassettes in America during the medium's heyday.

Plot
In 2003, Passaic, New Jersey, the declining "Be Kind Rewind" VHS rental store owned by Mr. Elroy Fletcher is due to be demolished to make way for high-end development unless he can find the money to renovate his building, despite his claims that jazz pianist Fats Waller was born in that building. His building is condemned as a slum and the officials give him 60 days to upgrade the building to the required standards or they will demolish it.

Mr. Fletcher leaves on a trip for several days joining some friends to memorialize Waller, as well as visiting rental store chains to research efficient and modernized ways of running a video rental store, leaving his only employee, Mike, to tend to the store. Before leaving Mr. Fletcher cautions Mike to keep his paranoid and klutzy conspiracy theorist friend, Jerry, away from the store. However, Mike reads it in reverse on the steamed up train window, and does not understand.

After attempting to sabotage a nearby electrical substation, believing its energy to be melting his brain, Jerry receives an electrical shock which leaves him magnetized, and when he enters the store the next day, he inadvertently erases all the VHS tapes in the store (as well as interfering with local TV reception). Mike quickly discovers the disaster, and is further pressed when Miss Falewicz, an acquaintance of Mr. Fletcher, wants to rent Ghostbusters. To prevent her from reporting a problem to Mr. Fletcher, Mike comes up with an idea: as Miss Falewicz has never seen the movie, he proposes to recreate the film using himself and Jerry as the actors and cheap special effects hoping to fool her. They complete the movie just in time when another customer asks for Rush Hour 2. Mike and Jerry repeat their filming, enlisting the help of Alma, a local woman, for some of the parts. Alma later makes Jerry a remedy that demagnetizes him.

Word of mouth spreads through Miss Falewicz's nephew of the inadvertently hilarious results of Mike and Jerry's filming, and soon the store is seeing more requests for such movies. Mike, Jerry, and Alma quickly pass off the movies as being "sweded", insisting the films came from Sweden and thus able to demand long wait times and higher costs for the rental ($20 instead of $1). Soon, to meet demand, Mike and Jerry enlist the locals to help out in making the movies, using them as starring roles in their films. When Mr. Fletcher returns, intent on converting the store to a DVD rental outlet, he quickly recognizes that they are making more money from the sweded films than from normal rentals, and joins in with the process. However, the success is put to a halt when two court bailiffs arrive, insisting the sweded films are copyright violations, and seize the tapes and the store's assets, crushing the tapes with a steamroller. Without any money to renovate the building, Mr. Fletcher gives up hope, and is forced to reveal to Mike that he made up the connection of Fats Waller to their building. Mr. Fletcher is given a week to evacuate the building before it will be razed.

Jerry, with the help of the local townspeople, convinces Mr. Fletcher and Mike to give one last hurrah and put together an original documentary dedicated to the fake life of Fats Waller, and the two quickly warm up to the idea. They create Fats Waller Was Born Here.

On the day the building is scheduled for demolition, Mr. Fletcher invites all the locals to watch the final film, but quietly reveals to Miss Falewicz that he gave the city official permission to go ahead with the demolition plans after the film has ended. Jerry accidentally breaks the store's TV screen trying to raise it for all to see, but a nearby DVD store owner loans them his video projector, allowing them to show the movie on a white cloth placed in the store's window. As their film ends, Mr. Fletcher, Mike and Jerry exit the store to find a larger crowd has gathered in the street to watch the film through the window, including the city official and wrecking crew, and they are given a rousing applause by the gathered crowd.

The credits roll with more of the mockumentary and Fats Waller singing "Your Feet's Too Big".

Cast

 Mos Def as Mike Coolwell 
 Jack Black as Jerry McLean
 Danny Glover as Elroy Fletcher
 Mia Farrow as Miss Falewicz
 Melonie Diaz as Alma Sykes
 Arjay Smith as Manny
 Quinton Aaron as Q
 Chandler Parker as Craig
 Karolina Wydra as Gabrielle Bochenski
 P. J. Byrne as Mr. Baker
 Matt Walsh as Officer Julian
 Paul Dinello as Mr. Rooney 
 Sigourney Weaver as Ms. Lawson 
 Marcus Carl Franklin as Kid #1
 Jon Glaser as Video Store manager
 Marco Quevedo as Cool Library Kid
 Booker T. Jones, Steve Cropper, Donald "Duck" Dunn, Jimmy Scott and McCoy Tyner appear as Fats Waller fans in a scene cut from the theatrical release, but restored for the DVD.

"Sweded"

Films that were erased and recreated are referred to as having been sweded. These remakes are unedited with only a single take per scene. The tapes are described as having come from Sweden as an excuse for higher rental fees and longer wait times. Jerry fabricates the word "sweded" while arguing with Craig (Chandler Parker) and his gang.

In light of the theme of sweding, director Michel Gondry sweded a version of the trailer of the film, starring himself. On the official website, users can engage in sweding, which puts their faces on the VHS cover of a movie. The Be Kind Rewind YouTube channel also encourages filmmakers to create sweded versions of popular movies. A Sweded Film Festival launched in 2016 to showcase fanmade sweded films.

The theme of sweding also relates to film history, in that the collectively made remakes represent social memories of films, and memories that arise through films.

Reception

Box office
In its opening weekend, the film earned $4 million in 808 theaters in the United States and Canada, ranking No. 9 at the box office, and averaging $5,013 per theater. As of September 21, 2008, the film had grossed $30.4 million worldwide—an estimated $11 million in the United States and Canada and $19 million in other territories.

Reception 
Be Kind Rewind has received mixed reviews, with review aggregator Rotten Tomatoes reporting that 65% of critics gave the film positive reviews, based on 128 reviews, with an average rating of 6.3/10. The site's critical consensus reads, "Slighter and less disciplined than Gondry's previous mind-benders." Metacritic reported the film had an average score of 52 out of 100, based on 35 reviews.

Writing in The New York Times, reviewer A. O. Scott called the film "inviting, undemanding and altogether wonderful" and added that "you'll want to see it again, or at least Swede it yourself."

References

External links

2008 films
American comedy films
British comedy films
2000s English-language films
2008 comedy films
Films about films
Films directed by Michel Gondry
Films set in New Jersey
Films shot in New Jersey
French comedy films
English-language French films
New Line Cinema films
Focus Features films
2000s American films
2000s French films